The Dawn of a Tomorrow is a 1924 American silent drama film directed by George Melford, produced by Famous Players-Lasky and distributed through Paramount Pictures, and starring Jacqueline Logan. It is based on the 1906 novel of the same name by Frances Hodgson Burnett  which had been filmed before in 1915 also titled as The Dawn of a Tomorrow with Mary Pickford. A play version had been produced on Broadway in 1909 which served as the final starring stage role for Eleanor Robson Belmont.

Plot
As described in a film magazine review, Sir Oliver Holt, ill and fearing a coming insanity, goes to a London slum intending to commit suicide. He is prevented from harming himself by Glad, a young woman of the slum, whose lover is a young burglar known as "The  Dandy." Sir Oliver employs Dandy to obtain money from his safe, having given him the combination. Dandy performs his task, incidentally stopping Sir Oliver's nephew from looting the safe. Dandy is accused of murdering a policeman. Sir Oliver establishes Dandy's innocence and Dandy and Glad become his wards.

Cast

Preservation
With no copies of The Dawn of a Tomorrow located in any film archives, it is a lost film.

References

External links

Stills at silentfilmstillarchive.com

1924 films
American silent feature films
Lost American films
Films based on British novels
Films based on works by Frances Hodgson Burnett
Films directed by George Melford
1924 drama films
Famous Players-Lasky films
Silent American drama films
American black-and-white films
1924 lost films
Lost drama films
1920s American films